William Paul Constantino Jr. is an American lawyer and politician who represented the 12th Worcester District in the Massachusetts House of Representatives from 1983 to 1995. His father, William P. Constantino, also served in that house. His nephew, Mike Bonin, is a former Los Angeles City Councilor.

References

1944 births
20th-century American politicians
College of the Holy Cross alumni
Fitchburg State University alumni
Suffolk University Law School alumni
Massachusetts lawyers
Republican Party members of the Massachusetts House of Representatives
People from Clinton, Massachusetts
Living people